Ahmad Khoshoi (born 2 March 1939) is an Iranian wrestler. He competed in the men's Greco-Roman flyweight at the 1964 Summer Olympics.

References

1939 births
Living people
Iranian male sport wrestlers
Olympic wrestlers of Iran
Wrestlers at the 1964 Summer Olympics
Place of birth missing (living people)